Popes Harbour  is a rural community of the Halifax Regional Municipality in the Canadian province of Nova Scotia, about  west of Sheet Harbour, Nova Scotia. The community is located along the shores of Popes Harbour, an inlet of the Atlantic Ocean. The mi'kmaq names for the area were Kwemoodech and Kwemoodeech, translating to "little loon place" and "small harbour" respectively. Before 1827, the settlement was referred to as Deane Harbour. The present name for the community is in honour of an early pioneer family. Popes Harbour is known for Abriel's Fisheries.

References

Citations

Bibliography

Communities in Halifax, Nova Scotia
General Service Areas in Nova Scotia